

Champions

Major League Baseball
 American League: Philadelphia Athletics
 National League: Pittsburgh Pirates

Other champions

Statistical leaders

American League
Home Runs:  Socks Seybold, Philadelphia Athletics: 16
Batting average: Nap Lajoie, Philadelphia wieners.: .378
Wins:  Cy Young, Boston Americans: 32-11

National League
Home Runs: Tommy Leach, Pittsburgh Pirates: 6
Batting average: Ginger Beaumont, Pittsburgh Pirates: .357
Wins: Jack Chesbro, Pittsburgh Pirates: 28-6

Major league baseball final standings

American League final standings

National League final standings

Events

January–March
 March 12 – Mike Donlin of the Baltimore Orioles is arrested for assault.  Donlin will plead guilty and serve a 6-month jail sentence.

April
 April 19 – Bob Ewing of the Cincinnati Reds, in his Major League debut, ties a National League record by walking 7 batters in one inning.
 April 26 – Addie Joss of the Cleveland Bronchos throws a one-hitter in his Major League debut.

May
 May 13 – All nine players for the Cincinnati Reds collect at least 2 hits in a 24-2 thrashing of the Philadelphia Phillies.
 May 16 – Dummy Hoy of the Cincinnati Reds bats against Dummy Taylor of the New York Giants in the first inning.  It is the first time that two deaf-mutes have faced one another.
 May 24 – Bill Bradley of the Cleveland Bluebirds sets an American league record by homering in his fourth consecutive game, a record not matched until Babe Ruth does it on June 25, 1918.
 May 30 – Roger Bresnahan of the Baltimore Orioles hits 2 inside-the-park home runs against the Cleveland Bronchos.

June
 June 2 – The Cleveland Bronchos commit 6 errors in one inning against the Baltimore Orioles.  It will be the most errors by a team in one inning for the entire 20th century.
 June 3 – Mike O'Neill of the St. Louis Cardinals connects for the first ever pinch-hit grand slam home run.
 June 15 – Future major leaguer Nig Clarke goes 8-8, all home runs, as his Corsicana team blasts Texarkana 51-3 in a Texas League game.  Corsicana collects 53 hits, including 21 homers, in playing the game in a park where right field is only 210' from home plate.
June 30 –  The Cleveland Bronchos becomes the first American League team to hit three consecutive home runs in one inning, as Nap Lajoie, Charlie Hickman and Bill Bradley connect in the sixth off St. Louis Browns pitcher Jack Harper, with all the homers landing in the left field bleachers at St. Louis. The last two come on the first pitch thrown, while Cleveland wins the game 17–2. The feat was last done in the National League on May 10, 1894.

July
 July 1 – Rube Waddell of the Philadelphia Athletics faces the minimum 27 batters in pitching a two-hit shutout against the Baltimore Orioles.  Waddell strikes out the side three times in the game, once on nine pitches.  Billy Gilbert, Harry Howell and Jack Cronin are the strikeout victims in all three innings.
 July 8 – John McGraw signs a contract to become the manager of the New York Giants.  McGraw will remain as the Giants manager for the next 30 years, winning ten National League pennants and three World Series.
 July 8 – In his first game for the Philadelphia Athletics, Danny Murphy arrives late in the second inning and is immediately put in the game.  He proceeds to go 6-for-6 at the plate, which includes a grand slam off of Cy Young, and handles 12 chances without committing an error at second base.
 July 17 – The Baltimore Orioles, due to an exodus of players to the Giants, are left with only five available players for a game against the St. Louis Browns. The Orioles are forced to forfeit the contest, and the American League takes control of the team for the remainder of the season: the Orioles subsequently moved to New York in 1903.
 July 25 – At West Side Park, Cincinnati Reds outfielder Cy Seymour sets a major-league record by hitting four sacrifice flies in a 6–1 victory over the Chicago Orphans. Seymour will be tied but never topped.

August
 August 13 – Harry Davis of the Philadelphia Athletics steals second base with teammate Dave Fultz on third in an attempt to score Fultz.  When he draws no throw, Davis then steals back to first base on the next pitch.  He then steals second again, this time drawing the throw, scoring Fultz.
 August 14 – Tommy Leach of the Pittsburgh Pirates hit only 13 home runs over the fence in a career of over 2,100 games.  On this day, however, he does it twice against the Boston Beaneaters.  Leach will go on to win the National League home run crown in 1902 with 6.
 August 18 – Hal O'Hagan, of the Rochester Broncos, turns professional baseball's first unassisted triple play against Jersey City in a minor league game.
 August 19 – Kip Selbach of the Baltimore Orioles ties a record by committing 5 errors from the outfield in one game.

September
 September 1 – The Chicago Cubs famed trio of Joe Tinker, Johnny Evers and Frank Chance appear in the team's lineup for the first time together.
 September 10 – Rube Waddell of the Philadelphia Athletics, making only six relief appearance all season, starts twice in a double-header against the Baltimore Orioles and gets the victory in both games.
 September 20 – Nixey Callahan of the Chicago White Sox pitches the first no-hitter in franchise history as he defeats the Detroit Tigers 2–0.

October–December
 October 2 – The Boston Beaneaters defeat the New York Giants 2-1 in 14 innings.  The game produces 8 runners thrown out attempting to steal, 3 pick-offs, 3 double-plays and 2 runners thrown out at the plate.

Births

January
January 2 – Nick Dumovich
January 2 – Ray Jacobs
January 3 – Jim McLaughlin
January 4 – Ted Odenwald
January 6 – Bob Barnes
January 7 – Cliff Knox
January 7 – Al Todd
January 14 – Smead Jolley
January 16 – Joe Connell
January 16 – Pip Koehler
January 26 – Johnny Frederick
January 27 – Ollie Tucker
January 28 – Pat Crawford
January 28 – Jackie Gallagher
January 29 – Elmer Eggert

February
February 9 – Don Hankins
February 9 – Julie Wera
February 12 – Kiddo Davis
February 27 – Roy Hutson

March
March 2 – Moe Berg
March 4 – Emmett McCann
March 15 – Fred Bennett
March 16 – Jake Flowers
March 18 – Squire Potter
March 23 – Johnny Moore

April
April 2 – Bill Yancey
April 7 – Buck Redfern
April 8 – Carl Husta
April 13 – Ben Cantwell
April 18 – Bob Linton
April 21 – Lefty Weinert
April 22 – Ray Benge
April 26 – Steve Slayton
April 28 – Red Lucas
April 30 – Bill Deitrick

May
May 2 – Freddy Sale
May 3 – Ralph Michaels
May 7 – Sal Gliatto
May 9 – Wally Dashiell
May 12 – Dutch Henry
May 13 – Hal Neubauer
May 16 – Watty Clark
May 16 – Howie Fitzgerald
May 21 – Earl Averill
May 22 – Dick Jones
May 22 – Al Simmons
May 26 – Herb Thomas
May 30 – Lou McEvoy

June
June 5 – Charlie Gooch
June 6 – Fresco Thompson
June 9 – Lee Dunham
June 11 – Ernie Nevers
June 20 – Wayland Dean
June 23 – Leon Pettit
June 24 – Juan Antonio Yanes
June 25 – Ralph Erickson
June 30 – Hal Smith

July
July 1 – Kent Greenfield
July 5 – Frank Naleway
July 7 – Art Merewether
July 7 – Ted Radcliffe
July 13 – Bill Lasley
July 29 – Luther Roy

August
August 1 – Howard Freigau
August 2 – Joe Klinger
August 3 – Joe Sprinz
August 3 – Doug Taitt
August 4 – Homer Blankenship
August 4 – Bill Hallahan
August 4 – Al Moore
August 24 – Jack Blott
August 24 – Jimmy Hudgens
August 28 – Art Jacobs
August 28 – Wally Roettger
August 30 – Pete Cote

September
September 3 – Bill Moore
September 7 – Cleo Carlyle
September 8 – Ernie Orsatti
September 15 – Rap Dixon
September 15 – Russ Young
September 19 – Jim Begley
September 19 – Bruce Connatser
September 22 – Ollie Marquardt
September 25 – Pat Malone
September 28 – Leon Chagnon
September 30 – Blackie Carter

October
October 8 – Paul Schreiber
October 9 – Kenny Hogan
October 9 – Jimmy Welsh
October 10 – Homer Peel
October 12 – Stew Bolen
October 15 – Evar Swanson
October 18 – Charlie Berry
October 22 – Rusty Yarnall
October 27 – Jim Keesey

November
November 9 – Mike Kelly
November 11 – Ownie Carroll
November 14 – Gil Paulsen
November 15 – Jay Partridge
November 19 – Joe Palmisano
November 20 – Augie Prudhomme
November 24 – Cloy Mattox

December
December 1 – Red Badgro
December 3 – Al Spohrer
December 4 – Chuck Corgan
December 12 – Pee-Wee Wanninger
December 15 – Frank Watt
December 18 – Les Burke
December 18 – Joe Buskey
December 20 – Carl Yowell
December 23 – Max Rosenfeld
December 26 – Bill Cronin

Deaths
February 1 – Bill Sharsig, 47, Co-owner, general manager, business manager and on-field manager of the American Association Philadelphia Athletics.
February 4 – Tom Hernon, 35, outfielder for the 1897 Chicago Colts.
February 16 – Tom O'Meara, 29, catcher and first baseman of the Cleveland Spiders from 1895 to 1896.
March 19 – Tom Burns, 44, infielder for the Chicago White Stockings/Colts (1890–1890) and Pittsburgh Pirates, who also managed Pittsburgh (1892) and the Chicago Orphans (1898–1899).
March 22 – Johnny Ryan, 48, baseball pioneer who played in the early years of the National League for the Philadelphia White Stockings (1873), Baltimore Canaries (1874), New Haven Elm Citys (1875), Louisville Grays (1876) and Cincinnati Reds (1877).
March 27 – Tom Morrison, 32, infielder/outfielder who played from 1895 through 1896 for the Louisville Colonels.
March 7 – Pud Galvin, 45, pitcher who amassed record 361 victories, including two no-hitters, primarily with Buffalo and Pittsburgh; career marks in games (697), innings (5941) and shutouts (57) were all records as well.
April 4 – Charlie Sweeney, 38, pitcher the Providence Grays who left to play for the Union Association champs, the St. Louis Maroons. Between the two teams, he had a 41-15 win–loss record. By leaving the Grays, he left them without another starting pitcher, which allowed Charles Radbourn to win 59 games.
April 5 – Dave Eggler, 52, center fielder for 11 seasons, including five in the short-lived National Association, who batted .272 in 576 career games.
April 18 – George Grosart, 22, left fielder for the 1901 Boston Beaneaters.
May 2 – Bill Greenwood, 45, second baseman for five teams from 1882 to 1890.
June 12 – Tim Donahue, 32, catcher who played from 1891 to 1902 with the Boston Reds, Chicago Colts/Orphans and Washington Senators, hitting .236 in 466 games in part of eight seasons.
June 23 – John Firth, 47, pitcher who played briefly for the 1884 Richmond Virginians of the American Association.
July 15 – Pat Whitaker, 36, pitcher for the early Baltimore Orioles in 1888 and 1889.
July 27 – Packy Dillon, catcher for the 1875 St. Louis Red Stockings.
August 30 – Rome Chambers, 26, pitcher for the 1900 Boston Beaneaters.
September 23 – George Prentiss, 26, pitcher for the 1901 Boston Americans and 1902 Baltimore Orioles.
November 5 – Daisy Davis, 43, pitcher who posted a 16-21 record in 40 games for the 1884 St. Louis Browns and the 1885 Boston Beaneaters.
November 18 – Watch Burnham, 42, National League umpire between 1883 and 1885, who called balls and strikes for a no-hitter hurled by Charles Radbourn of the Providence Grays in 1883, and later managed the 1887 Indianapolis Hoosiers.
December 1 – Fred Dunlap, 43, second baseman who played from 1880 to 1891 for six different teams and managed three of them, who led the National League in doubles in 1880 and the Union Association in batting average, home runs, hits and runs scored during the 1884 season, while leading the St. Louis Maroons to the championship title.
December 4 – Mike Mansell, 44, left fielder who hit .239 in 371 games for six teams from 1879 to 1884, who led the American Association in doubles and triples during the 1884 season.
December 11 – Bill Hawke, 32, pitcher who posted a 32-31 record with the St. Louis Browns and Baltimore Orioles National Leagues teams from 1892 to 1894, including a no-hitter against the Washington Senators in 1893.
December 16 – Frank Buttery, 51, utility who hit a .215 average in 18 games and posted a 3-2 record as a pitcher for the 1872 Middletown Mansfields of the National Association.

Sources